The A1, also commonly Rruga e Kombit or SH10, is the longest and only toll motorway in Albania, stretching  in the counties of Lezhë and Kukës. It consists for the most part of two traffic lanes and an emergency lane in each driving direction separated by a central reservation. 
 
The motorway constitutes part of a larger corridor connecting the Albanian Adriatic Sea Coast in the southwest across the Albanian Alps with the Republic of Kosovo in the northeast. The significance of the motorway is reflected through its positive economic and cultural impact on the towns and cities within both countries it connects as well as its importance to tourism in Albania.

The highway is also commonly known as Autostrada Shqipëri-Kosovë or Autostrada Durrës-Kukës and starts near Lezhë, Albania, passes through Kukës, enters Kosovo as R7, and ends in Pristina near Đurđica, Kosovo. As part of the South-East European Route 7, the highway will connect the Adriatic Sea ports of Durrës and Shëngjin in Albania via Pristina, with the E75/Corridor X near Niš, Serbia. The project was a joint venture by the American-Turkish consortium Bechtel-ENKA, Austrian, Slovenian, and Albanian companies. It is expected to be finalized through a PPP road concession and maintenance project operated by Albanian Highway Concession shpk.

Dubbed the “patriotic highway”, the project links Albanians in Kosovo and Albania, helping to boost cultural and economic ties. The project is Albania's largest in decades, costing over one billion euros. It includes a six kilometer tunnel in Albania, making travel and trade easier for the hundreds of thousands of people vacationing in Albania during summer holidays and for business.

Description 

A1 Motorway represents a major northeast–southwest motorway in Albania connecting the Albanian Adriatic Sea Coast in the southwest to the Albanian Alps in the northeast. A significant part of the road network of Albania, it constitutes part of the European route E851 starting at Petrovac in Montenegro across Shkodër and Kukës to Pristina in Kosovo. The planned southwestern part of the motorway around Durrës County is considered to be a segment of the Adriatic–Ionian motorway that will stretch following completion across the Balkan Peninsula from Italy in the north to Greece in the south. In Kosovo, the A1 continues as the R7 part of the Pan-European Corridor X.

Rruga e Kombit (Nation's Highway) is a toll highway stretching between Milot, Rrëshen, Kalimash, Kukes and the border with Kosovo in Northern Albania part of the Durrës-Kukës Corridor. In June 2009, the highway was opened to traffic with the inauguration of the Thirrë-Kalimash Tunnel, while other sections were partially completed in subsequent years as the highway is still under construction.

Once the motorway became tolled in 2018, the security and configuration of remaining segments between Kolsh, Kukës, and Morinë (border with Kosovo) part of the SH5 Highway has drastically improved with the construction of new interchanges. The section between Milot and Rrëshen is a single carriageway, while several viaducts near Kukes were only recently expanded into dual carriageways. The Milot Interchange was completed as a trumpet interchange in 2019.
 
The highway has also boosted tourism in Albania and deepened the cultural and economic exchanges between Albania and Kosovo. As most tourists come through Kosovo, the laying of the highway make it easier to travel to the Durrës and Shengjin ports along the Adriatic Sea.

Rrëshen–Kalimash 

A total of one tunnel and 27 viaducts have been constructed through the steep and mountainous terrain.

There are 17 viaducts in the area from Reps to Thirrë. The use of a hydro-powered electricity grid instead of diesel generators has helped in reducing the carbon footprint of the project. As a result,  emissions have dropped by  each month. The above segment as opposed to the other ones is of a higher quality both for security and construction parameters.

Tunneling 

The highway passes through a -long double-bore tunnel. Construction works on the tunnel began in May 2007 and were completed with one tunnel tube inaugurated in June 2009. The south-bound tunnel was completed in July 2010.

All four faces of the two tubes of the tunnel have been worked on simultaneously. Laying road on Mt. Runes proved to be a challenge for the engineers. Another challenge was the transportation of construction equipment and material. As about 3,800 people worked on the project, there was the additional responsibility of feeding, clothing and housing them.
A partial collapse occurred at a  section in the central-south bore of the tunnel in November 2009. No injuries or equipment damages were reported. The collapse occurred because of heavy overbreak (during excavation) at a geologically complex area inside the tunnel and delayed the completion of the south-bound tunnel. During the tunnel construction, the tunneling team encountered five types of rock. In fact, only the north-bound tunnel was opened as per schedule in June 2009.

Tolling 

Since 2018, A1 is operated by Albanian Highway Concession shpk. Toll booths were installed, and became operational in September 2018, east of the tunnel entrance at Kolsh, as part of making A1 the first toll motorway in Albania. Once the company took over the management of the motorway, significant improvements were made to the safety and design of the motorway. Such improvements include the construction of new interchanges, pedestrian overpasses, installing of fencing and electronic signage, expanding of viaducts, and the eventual construction of the new bridge over Drini River.

In March 2018, the motorway became a toll highway, but only temporarily. Such move was fiercely opposed by locals who claimed lack of consultation from the government and unaffordable fees. The protests turned violent and consequently made the government to withdraw from their position, and eventually consultations took place with the affected parties. After undergoing renovations, the toll plaza was finally re-opened in September 2018.

Funding and Contractors 

The highway project is the biggest road infrastructure project ever done in Albania. Its initial cost was estimated at €600m but during the course of construction this has more than doubled. The project was financed by the government of Albania and some foreign lending institutions. The total cost of the highway is estimated to be over €1bn ($1.4bn). amid allegations of corruption and a growing public debt.

The contract for the construction of road segment between Rreshen and Kalimash, which constitutes one-third of the whole project, was awarded to a joint venture between Bechtel, a US-based engineering company, and Enka, a Turkey-based construction company. The contract was awarded in September 2006 and a majority of the construction works were completed by June 2009, even though construction on Milot-Rreshen started in 2003 by the government of Fatos Nano. Contractors working in the remaining portions of the highway were Albanian, Austrian, and Slovenian based firms. The R7 motorway in Kosovo was also constructed by Bechtel-Enka.

Exit list

Impact

Since the end of the Kosovo War of 1999, hundreds of thousands of Albanians have passed through the old mountain road to get to Albania's beaches. Building a highway would "crystallize a year-round tourism industry and double the size of the Albanian market", while allowing both communities to rationalize agriculture. Travel times are expected to be lowered to two and a half hours or less, down from seven.

Once finalized, the project will link the Adriatic Sea with the Pan-European corridor X at the E80 near the town of Merdar between the contested Kosovo-Serbia border.

US Congressman Eliot Engel has compared Sali Berisha's vision to build this highway to that of Eisenhower to build highways across the United States.

See also 

 Motorways in Albania  
 Transport in Albania  
 Adriatic Ionian Corridor

Notes

References

External links  
Albanian Highway Concession Official Website
Bechtel Official Website
Enka Official Website

Motorways in Albania
Transport in Durrës County
Transport in Tirana County
Transport in Lezhë County
Kukës County
Albania–Kosovo relations
Pan-European Corridor VIII